Rubber Duckie is South Korean all-female indie rock band. The band was formed originally in 2004 in Bucheon, but went on hiatus a year later. The band returned to perform in Hongdae, Seoul in late 2009. They were featured on Arirang Radio's program "Music180 - Musician Search" in July 2010 and in the episode "Breaking Down Our Prejudice" of Arirang TV's program "Rock on Korea" in July 2013. In June 2013 Rubber Duckie collaborated on stage with another all-female indie rock band Swingz and formed project group "Walking After U".

Members

Current 
 Jia (guitar, vocals, leader)
 Sunny (drums, vocals)

Former 
 Baemi (bass guitar, vocals)
 Baeky (drums, vocals)

Discography

Singles 
 I Am A Single, February 2010
 고맙다 수원, September 2010
 Come on, March 2013

Albums 
 미운오리 이야기, August 2011

External links 
 Rubber Duckie in naver music
 Fan page 

South Korean indie rock groups
All-female bands